Danne Sundman (6 December 1973 – 24 November 2018) was a politician from the Åland Islands, an autonomous and unilingually Swedish territory of Finland.

 Member of the Lagting (Åland parliament) 2001- 
 Minister of administration, law affairs and information technology 1999-2001

In April 2008, Sundman sponsored a proposal to reset clocks in the Åland Islands from Finnish standard time (UTC +2) to Swedish time (UTC +1).

References

External links
 Official site

1973 births
2018 deaths
Politicians from Åland